Las Palmas is a rocket launch site in Argentina at  used on November 12, 1966, for the launch of two Titus rockets for observing a solar eclipse.

References

Rocket launch sites in Argentina